Vulpia ciliata is a species of plant in the family Poaceae (true grasses).

Sources

References 

Pooideae
Flora of Malta